Joseph Rael (Tiwa: Tslew-teh-koyeh: "Beautiful Painted Arrow") (b. 1935) is a Native American ceremonial dancer, shaman, writer, and artist. He is also known as the founder of a global network of Sound Peace Chambers.

Early life and education
Rael was born in 1935 on the Southern Ute Indian Reservation. His father, Alfred Rael (Red Fish), was a Tiwa-speaking native of Picuris Pueblo; his mother, Beatrice Head, was a granddaughter of the Ute chief. The family moved to the Picuris Pueblo near Taos, New Mexico when Joseph was about seven. Here he received the name Tslew-teh-koyeh (Beautiful Painted Arrow). He was educated at the Santa Fe Indian School, and holds a B.A. in political science from the University of New Mexico and an M.A. from the University of Wisconsin–Madison.

Sound Peace Chambers
In 1983, Rael conceived the idea of building a kiva-like structure, which he called a Sound Peace Chamber, "where people of all races might gather to chant and sing for world peace and to purify the earth and oceans". He built the first in Bernalillo, New Mexico. His work inspired others to build a network of Sound Peace Chambers around the world, and there are now such chambers in Australia, Austria, Bolivia, Brazil, Canada, Denmark, England, Germany, Ireland, Norway, Puerto Rico, Scotland and Wales, as well as in the U.S. states of Arizona, Colorado, Georgia, Louisiana, Maine, Michigan, New Mexico, New York, North Carolina, Oklahoma, Pennsylvania, Tennessee, Texas, and Virginia.

Ceremonial dances
Rael also began creating and leading ceremonial dances, which he has taught to people of all nationalities. He wrote that he created three dances: the "Long Dance", the "Sun-Moon Dance", and the "Drum Dance". He retired from active leadership of these dances in 1999.

Semi-retirement
Rael is currently semi-retired and resides on the Southern Ute Indian Reservation in Colorado, where he continues to paint visionary art. His art has been shown in galleries in North Carolina, Texas, and Norway.

Bibliography
Rael has written a number of books which are based primarily on the Tiwa world view.
 Beautiful Painted Arrow: Stories and Teachings from the Native American Tradition. Element Books, 1992. 
 Being and Vibration, with Mary E. Marlow. Council Oak Books, 1993. ; 2003 reprint. 
 Tracks of Dancing Light: A Native American Approach to Understanding Your Name. Element Books, 1994. 
 The Way of Inspiration: Teachings of Native American Elder Joseph Rael. Council Oak Books, 1996. 
 Ceremonies of the Living Spirit. Council Oak Books, 1997. 
 House of Shattering Light: Life as an American Indian Mystic. Council Oak Books, 2003. 
 Sound: Native Teachings and Visionary Art of Joseph Rael. Council Oak Books, 2009. 
 Walking the Medicine Wheel: Healing Trauma and PTSD. Millichap Books/Pointer Oak, 2016. 
 Becoming Medicine: Pathways of Initiation into a Living Spirituality. Condor & Eagle Press, 2020. 
 Becoming Who You Are: Beautiful Painted Arrow’s Life & Lessons for Children Ages 10-100. Condor & Eagle Press, 2021.

See also
 List of Native American artists
 Visual arts by indigenous peoples of the Americas

Notes

References
 Wilt, Kurt. The Visionary: Entering the Mystic Universe of Joseph Rael (Beautiful Painted Arrow). Council Oak Books, 2011.

External links
 
 1992 photo of Rael by R. Henley
 PeaceChamber.co.uk

1935 births
Living people
20th-century Native Americans
21st-century Native Americans
Artists from Colorado
Artists from New Mexico
Native American installation artists
Native American writers
University of Wisconsin–Madison alumni
People from Picuris Pueblo, New Mexico
Ute people
Writers from Colorado
Writers from New Mexico